The 2001 Rally New Zealand (formally the 32nd Propecia Rally New Zealand) was the tenth round of the 2001 World Rally Championship. The race was held over three days between 21 September and 23 September 2001, and was won by Subaru's Richard Burns, his 10th and last win in the World Rally Championship.

Background

Entry list

Itinerary
All dates and times are NZST (UTC+12).

Results

Overall

World Rally Cars

Classification

Special stages

Championship standings

FIA Cup for Production Rally Drivers

Classification

Special stages

Championship standings

References

External links 
 Official website of the World Rally Championship

New Zealand
Rally New Zealand
Rally